Raymond A. Dypski (June 21, 1923 – October 31, 2004) was a member of the Maryland House of Delegates representing Baltimore, Maryland.

Early life
Dypski was born in a two-story row house on Dillon Street in Baltimore on June 21, 1923. He attended Baltimore public schools. His father was an Austrian immigrant and his mother worked in a cannery in Canton. His father died from an automobile accident when he was a child.

Dypski dropped out of junior high school to serve in World War II. He later got his GED at Patterson High School in 1969.

Career
After dropping out, Dypski served with the U.S. Merchant Marines from 1943 to 1945, during World War II. He was a metallurgical tester and inspector for the Bethlehem Steel Corporation at Sparrows Point.

Dypski served in the Maryland House of Delegates, representing Baltimore, from 1967 to 1986. He decided not to seek re-election due to failing health.

Personal life
His younger brother, Cornell N. Dypski, was also a member of the Maryland House of Delegates and a member of the Maryland Senate.

He was friends with state senator Julian L. Lapides.

Death
Dypski died on October 31, 2004, of heart and kidney failure at Mercy Medical Center in Baltimore.

References

1923 births
2004 deaths
Politicians from Baltimore
United States Merchant Mariners of World War II
Bethlehem Steel people
Members of the Maryland House of Delegates
21st-century American politicians